Birori is a comune (municipality) in the Province of Nuoro in the Italian region Sardinia, located about  north of Cagliari and about  west of Nuoro.

Birori borders the following municipalities: Borore, Bortigali, Dualchi, Macomer.

Demographic evolution

References

Cities and towns in Sardinia